Holbrook Working (February 5, 1895 – October 5, 1985) was an American professor of economics and statistics at Stanford University's Food Research Institute known for his contributions on hedging, on the theory of futures prices, on an early theory of market maker behavior, and on the theory of storage (including the Working curve which plots the difference between short term and long term grain futures prices against current inventory).

Biography 
He was born in Fort Collins, Colorado, on February 5, 1895.

Working earned his Ph.D. in Agricultural Economics from the University of Wisconsin–Madison in 1921. He taught at Cornell University and the University of Minnesota before he joined Stanford's Food Research Institute in 1925. His younger brother Elmer Working made a major contribution on the identification problem for demand curves in econometrics, with which Holbrook Working was also involved.

Working disagreed with Keynes's backwardation theory of futures prices, which argued that short hedgers (farmers) drive down futures prices because of their demand for price insurance. Working argued that there could be hedgers on both sides of the market and that hedging was essentially not a risk reduction technique, but "speculation in the basis" which allows informed traders and commodity dealers to profit from their knowledge of future changes in the difference between futures and spot prices.

He was a founding member of the Econometric Society and was elected a Fellow of the American Agricultural Economics Association, the American Statistical Association, and the American Association for the Advancement of Science.  In 1981 he was awarded the Wilks Memorial Award by the American Statistical Association.

He died on October 5, 1985, in Santa Clara, California.

See also
Working–Hotelling procedure

Notable papers

References 

1895 births
1985 deaths
20th-century American economists
Cornell University faculty
Fellows of the American Statistical Association
Stanford University faculty
Fellows of the Econometric Society